"Chapter 3: The Sin" is the third episode of the first season of the American streaming television series The Mandalorian. It was written by the series' showrunner Jon Favreau, directed by Deborah Chow, and released on Disney+ on November 22, 2019. The episode stars Pedro Pascal as The Mandalorian, a lone bounty hunter who returns "the Child" to the mysterious Client (co-star Werner Herzog). The episode received a Primetime Emmy Awards nomination.

Plot 
The Mandalorian delivers "the Child" to the Client. He asks about the plans for the Child but is given no answer. When the Mandalorian returns to the secret Mandalorian enclave, his heavily damaged armor is replaced by the Armorer with a new set forged from some of the beskar reward. Another Mandalorian berates him for working with former agents of the Galactic Empire, who are responsible for their predicament; the Armorer defuses the situation by reminding them of the Way of Mandalore. Returning to the guild, the Mandalorian learns from Greef Karga that everyone in the guild had a tracking fob for the Child. Greef implores him to take some time to rest, but the Mandalorian insists on taking on another job. He asks Greef if he has any idea what The Client has planned for the Child, but Greef says he did not ask as it would be against the guild code, telling him he should forget about it. Despite accepting a new assignment and starting to prepare his ship to depart, the Mandalorian turns back to infiltrate The Client's base of operations.

Killing many Imperial stormtroopers, he rescues the Child from a laboratory. On the way back to his ship, the Mandalorian is ambushed by the other bounty hunters and Greef, who demand he hands the Child over. After he refuses, a firefight breaks out, leaving the Mandalorian heavily outnumbered and cornered, but warriors from the Mandalorian enclave unexpectedly arrive, attacking the bounty hunters and giving the Mandalorian cover to escape. Ambushing the Mandalorian on his ship, Greef gives him one last chance to surrender, but the Mandalorian outsmarts him and shoots him, ejecting him from the spacecraft. The Child's hand appears, reaching up to the console from below; the Mandalorian unscrews a control knob that he had earlier berated the Child for playing with and drops it into its hand.

Production

Development
The episode was directed by Deborah Chow, who is the first woman to direct a live-action Star Wars project. The episode was written by showrunner Jon Favreau, who also provided the voice of Paz Vizla.

Casting
On December 12, 2018, it was announced that Werner Herzog, Omid Abtahi, and Carl Weathers had joined the main cast, as The Client, Dr. Pershing and Greef Karga, respectively. Emily Swallow guest stars as The Armorer. Brendan Wayne and Lateef Crowder are credited as stunt doubles for The Mandalorian. Paz Vizla was voiced by Favreau and physically played by stunt double Tait Fletcher. Gene Freeman is credited as stunt double for Greef Karga. "The Child" was performed by various puppeteers.

Music
Ludwig Göransson composed the musical score for the episode. The soundtrack album for the episode was released on November 22, 2019.

Reception

Critical response 

"The Sin" received critical acclaim. On Rotten Tomatoes, the episode holds an approval rating of 94% with an average rating of 8.2/10, based on 33 reviews. The website's critics consensus reads, "Director Deborah Chow brings the action in 'The Sin', an effective and exciting installment that pushes deeper into The Mandalorians story."

In a positive review, Tyler Hersko, of IndieWire, stated that "[It] has done an admirable job of establishing its premise and most of its main characters in its first three episodes, but it remains to be seen if the rest of the season can move those elements in an interesting (and hopefully inventive) direction." Kelly Lawler of USA Today wrote: "Three episodes into the series set in a galaxy far, far away, Baby Yoda has emerged as the shining star of Mandalorian, the standout character who keeps fans coming back for more as the uneven series chugs on." Katie Rife of The A.V. Club gave the episode a grade B+, and praised Göransson's score, saying it sounds like Ennio Morricone's themes played by robots, "perfect for the show's tone".

Awards

The episode was nominated for the Primetime Emmy Award for Outstanding Fantasy/Sci-Fi Costumes.

References

External links
 
 

2019 American television episodes
Television shows directed by Deborah Chow
The Mandalorian episodes